WGVE-FM is an FM high school radio station broadcasting on 88.7 MHz in Gary, Indiana. It is owned and operated by Gary Community School Corporation. The station airs local news, music, and limited NPR programming, as well as high school and college sporting events.

History
WGVE-FM signed on in January 1954, and originally broadcast at 88.1 MHz. In 1963, its frequency was changed to 88.7 MHz. Originally located at Lew Wallace High School, it moved to its current location in the Gary Area Career Center in 1969.

References

External links
 WGVE webpage
 The Blues You Can Use Radio Show Official Website
 

GVE
Mass media in Gary, Indiana
High school radio stations in the United States
NPR member stations
Radio stations established in 1954
1954 establishments in Indiana